Boards of Canada are a Scottish electronic music duo consisting of brothers Michael Sandison and Marcus Eoin, formed initially as a group in 1986 before becoming a duo in the 1990s. Signing first to Skam followed by Warp Records in the 1990s, the duo subsequently received recognition following the release of their debut album Music Has the Right to Children on Warp in 1998. They followed with the critically acclaimed albums Geogaddi (2002), The Campfire Headphase (2005) and Tomorrow's Harvest (2013), but have remained reclusive and continue to rarely appear live.

The duo's work, largely influenced by outdated media and electronic music from the 1970s, incorporates vintage synthesizer tones, samples, analog equipment, and hip hop-inspired beats. It has been described by critics as exploring themes related to nostalgia, as well as childhood memory, science, environmental concerns and esoteric subjects. In 2012, Fact summarized them as "one of the best-known and best-loved electronic acts of the last two decades."

History

Early years (1986–1994)
Brothers Michael Sandison (born 1 June 1970) and Marcus Eoin (born Marcus Eoin Sandison, 21 July 1971) were brought up in Cullen, Moray on the north east coast of Scotland.
From 1979 to 1980 they lived in the Canadian city of Calgary while their father, who worked in construction, took part in the project to build the Saddledome. Both brothers attended the University of Edinburgh, where Michael studied music and Marcus studied artificial intelligence, though Marcus dropped out before completing his degree.

Growing up in a musical family, the brothers first played instruments at a young age. They experimented with recording techniques from around the age of 10, using tape machines to layer cut-up samples of found sounds over compositions of their own. In their teens they participated in a number of amateur bands. However, it was not until 1986 when Marcus was invited to join Mike's band that Boards of Canada was born. The band's name was inspired by the National Film Board of Canada (NFB), the government agency whose award winning documentary films and animation they had watched as children. Their first known release was Catalog 3, in 1987 on cassette tape, on the brothers' own label, Music70, while Boards of Canada was still a band (it was later repressed in 1997 on Compact Disc on the same label). By 1989, the band had been reduced to Mike and Marcus, and they released Acid Memories in the same year. Both albums have only been heard by the band's friends and family, except for a 24 second excerpt of "Duffy", released on the EHX website in the late 1990s. Acid Memories is the only early album the brothers have mentioned in interviews. Later, in the early 1990s, the band had a number of collaborations and the band put on small shows among the Hexagon Sun collective, along with the releases of albums Play By Numbers and Hooper Bay, both in 1994, which, similarly to Acid Memories, were only released to friends and family and had sub-1 minute excerpts of two songs ("Wouldn't You Like To Be Free" from Play By Numbers and "Circle" from Hooper Bay) released from both albums on the EHX website.

Music Has the Right to Children (1995–2002)
In 1995, the band made their first Hexagon Sun studio release, the EP Twoism. Like earlier Music70 releases, it was produced in a self-financed limited run and was privately distributed, primarily to friends and labels. Unlike previous releases, however, a small number of copies were also released to the public through a mailing list. Though not a widespread commercial release, it was considered of sufficient quality and worth to be subsequently re-pressed in 2002.

The band made another release in 1996, titled Boc Maxima; it was a semi-private release that was notable for being a full-length album, and was the precursor to Music Has the Right to Children, with which it shares many tracks.

Boards of Canada's first commercial release occurred after attracting the attention of Autechre's Sean Booth, of the English label Skam Records, one of many people who were sent a demo EP. Skam issued what was considered Boards of Canada's first "findable" work, Hi Scores, in 1996.

The debut studio album, Music Has the Right to Children, was released in April 1998. The album consists of longer tracks mixed with song vignettes. It also includes one of the duo's most popular songs, "Roygbiv". Music Has the Right to Children received widespread acclaim upon release. It featured at No. 35 on Pitchfork's "Top 100 Albums of the 1990s" list. It was ranked No. 91 in Mojo's 100 Modern Classics list.

John Peel featured Boards of Canada on his BBC Radio 1 programme in July of that year. The session featured two remixes from Music Has the Right to Children — "Aquarius (Version 3)" and "Olson (Version 3)" — along with the tracks "Happy Cycling" and "XYZ". "XYZ" was excluded from the Peel Session TX 21/07/1998 release until 2019.

Though never an actively touring band, Boards of Canada did perform a handful of shows. Early shows saw them supporting Warp labelmates Seefeel and Autechre in a handful of UK dates. They also participated in a few festivals and multi-artist bills including two Warp parties: Warp's 10th Anniversary Party in 1999 and The Incredible Warp Lighthouse Party almost one year later. They made their most prominent showing in 2001 as one of the headliners at the Tortoise-curated All Tomorrow's Parties. They have not performed a live show since.

The band released a four-track EP, In a Beautiful Place Out in the Country, in November 2000, their first original release in two years. The 12" edition was pressed on sky blue vinyl.

Geogaddi and The Campfire Headphase (2002–2009)
Their second studio album, Geogaddi, was released in February 2002. Like Music Has the Right to Children, this album consists of longer tracks mixed with song vignettes. It also presents a darker sound than its predecessor. Geogaddi received universal acclaim from music critics.

It was described by Sandison as "a record for some sort of trial-by-fire, a claustrophobic, twisting journey that takes you into some pretty dark experiences before you reach the open air again."

Their third album for Warp Records, The Campfire Headphase, was released on 17 October 2005 in Europe and 18 October 2005 in the United States. The album featured fifteen tracks, including "Peacock Tail", "Chromakey Dreamcoat," and "Dayvan Cowboy". Two versions of "Dayvan Cowboy" — the original and a remix by Odd Nosdam — are on the six-track EP, Trans Canada Highway, which was released on 26 May 2006.

In late 2009, the Warp20 (Recreated) compilation featured two BoC covers, one by Bibio of their song "Kaini Industries" and one by Mira Calix of "In a Beautiful Place Out in the Country". Warp20 (Recreated) is part of the larger Warp20 boxed set, which also includes two previously unreleased Boards of Canada tracks, "Seven Forty Seven" and a 1.8 second sample of the song "Spiro", which had previously been performed at their show at the Incredible Warp Lighthouse Party in 2000.

Tomorrow's Harvest (2013)
On Record Store Day 2013, a vinyl record containing a short clip of music which was believed to be the work of Boards of Canada surfaced at the New York record store Other Music. Shortly after the release, Warp Records vouched for the record's authenticity. The record (titled ------/------/------/XXXXXX/------/------) contained a short clip of audio followed by a voice reading six digits similar to that of a numbers station. The record revealed what was to become one of six unique numbers that were part of a type of alternate reality game that was used to promote the release of their next studio album.

The rest of the codes were hidden through various websites and online communities, as well as being broadcast over BBC Radio One, NPR, and Adult Swim. After much speculation, the official website for the band redirected users to another website which asked for the user to enter a password. Once all six unique codes are entered, a video is shown announcing Tomorrow's Harvest, their fourth studio album. The album was released on 5 June 2013 in Japan, 10 June 2013 in Europe, and 11 June 2013 in the United States to widespread critical acclaim.

Remixes
In 2016, Boards of Canada released two remixes. The first, of Nevermen's "Mr Mistake", was released on 12 January, and was followed shortly after by a remix of "Sisters" by Odd Nosdam on 22 February. On 17 February 2017, an instrumental version of the "Mr Mistake" remix was released. In 2017 Boards of Canada released a remix of "Sometimes" by The Sexual Objects. On July 3, 2021, Boards of Canada released a remix of a second Nevermen song, "Treat Em Right".

WXAXRXP (2019)
In 2019, Warp Records kicked off the celebrations for their 30th anniversary, entitled WXAXRXP, with a 100-hour takeover of online radio station NTS Radio, featuring mixes, radio shows and unreleased music from a number of artists on their roster. This included a 2-hour mixtape from Boards of Canada titled Societas x Tape, aired on 23 June 2019 at 9:00 PM BST, and featured music from other artists such as Grace Jones, Devo and Yellow Magic Orchestra, spliced with spoken word samples and music that is rumoured to be unreleased work from the group itself.

Style and methods
The music of Boards of Canada has been described as "evocative, mournful, sample-laden downtempo music often sounding as though produced on malfunctioning equipment excavated from the ruins of an early-'70s computer lab." Critic Simon Reynolds described their style as "a hazy sound of smeared synth-tones and analog-decayed production, carried by patient, sleepwalking beats, and aching with nostalgia" while crediting them with "reinvent[ing]" elements of psychedelia through the deliberate misuse of technology. Their distinctive style is a product of their use of analogue equipment, mix of electronic and conventional instrumentation, use of distorted samples, and their layering and blending of these elements. To achieve their evocative and "worn down" sound, the duo have made use of outdated brands of recording equipment, such as tape machines manufactured by Grundig. They also make use of samples from 1970s television shows and other media prevalent in the era of the brothers' shared childhood, especially the nature-inspired documentaries produced by the National Film Board of Canada. The duo's preoccupation with memory, past aesthetics, and public broadcasting presaged the 2000s electronic movement known as hauntology. Critic Adam Harper described their work as "a simultaneously Arcadian and sinister musical hauntology based on cut-up samples, vintage synthesiser technology and a faded modernism arising from mid-twentieth-century television, science, public education, childhood and spirituality."

Interviews with the Sandison brothers have variously provided insight into their creative process: they have cited several acts that have influenced their work including Joni Mitchell, the Incredible String Band (saying "we have all the String Band records […] our rural sensibilities are similar"), the Beatles (saying "[they] really became enthralling to us through their psychedelism") and My Bloody Valentine (saying "even if we don't sound like them, there's a connection in terms of the approach to music"). They have also named Meat Beat Manifesto as a chief influence, citing their synth sounds.

Brief interludes or vignettes feature prominently in the duo's music, often lasting less than two minutes; Sandison has said that "we write far more of [these] than the so-called 'full-on' tracks, and, in a way, they are our own favourites". Boards of Canada have written an enormous number of such fragments as well as full-length tracks, most of which have been held back from release, and it does not appear that their music is made exclusively for commercial release; rather, albums seem to be the result of selecting complementary songs from current work. For instance, Geogaddi allegedly involved the creation of 400 song fragments and 64 complete songs, of which 22 were selected (possibly 23, if the final track of complete silence is included). Eoin has said about the duo's discography that "the idea of the perfect album is this amorphous thing that we're always aiming at […] the whole point of making music is at least to aim at your own idea of perfection."

The duo have expressed interest in themes of subliminal messaging, and subsequently their work has incorporated cryptic messages, including references to numerology and cult figures such as David Koresh of the Branch Davidians. When questioned about their aims in making such references, the duo have expressed themselves in neutral terms (saying "We're not religious at all [...] and if we're spiritual at all it's purely in the sense of caring about art and inspiring people with ideas.") while remaining fascinated with the ability of music to influence the minds of others (saying, with irony, that "[We] do actually believe that there are powers in music that are almost supernatural. I think you actually manipulate people with music...").

Discography

Major releases

Studio albums
Music Has the Right to Children (1998)
Geogaddi (2002)
The Campfire Headphase (2005) 
Tomorrow's Harvest (2013)

EPs
Twoism (released unofficially on Music70 in 1995, reissued by Warp in 2002)
Hi Scores (1996)
Aquarius (1998)
Peel Session TX 21/07/1998 (1999)
In a Beautiful Place Out in the Country (2000)
Trans Canada Highway (2006)

Early/non-official

Unreleased albums
Catalog 3 (1987)
Acid Memories (1989)
Closes Vol. 1 (1992)
Hooper Bay (1994)
Play By Numbers (1994)
Old Tunes Vol. 1 (also known as A Few Old Tunes, 1996)
Old Tunes Vol. 2 (1996)
Boc Maxima (1996)

Bootlegs
Unreleased Tracks (2007)

Mixtapes
Random 35 Tracks Tape (unknown, presumed to be 1995)

Promotional
Telephasic Workshop (1998)
Geogaddi (Promotional LP) (2002)
------ / ------ / ------ / XXXXXX / ------ / ------ (2013)

Features On
We Are Reasonable People (1998)

See also

List of ambient music artists

References

External links

 – official site
Boards of Canada at Warp Records

Boards of Canada – unofficial wiki at bocpages.org

 
British ambient music groups
Scottish electronic music groups
Electronic music duos
Intelligent dance musicians
Musical groups established in 1986
Musical groups from Edinburgh
Male musical duos
Scottish musical duos
Sibling musical duos
Trip hop groups
Warp (record label) artists
1986 establishments in Scotland
1986 establishments in the United Kingdom
Downtempo musicians